Hafizabad District (Punjabi and ) is located in Punjab, Pakistan. Hafizabad was made a district in 1993; formerly, it was a tehsil of Gujranwala District. It is situated in central Punjab and is known for its rice industry on the agricultural side and rice industry on the industrial side and have top 5 exporters of rice from Pakistan.

The capital of the district, Hafizabad, known for strengthening the administration of Punjab.

History
In 327 BC, when Alexander the Great invaded the territory that is now Pakistan, the territory of the Sandal Bar (where Hafizabad is now located) was a populated area. Big cities were located in the district, and many sub-states were organized here in the presidency of native Maharajas and Rajas. In 997 CE, Sultan Mahmud Ghaznavi, took over the Ghaznavid dynasty empire established by his father, Sultan Sebuktegin. In 1005, he conquered the Shahis in Kabul and followed it up by the conquests of the Punjab region.

The Delhi Sultanate and later Mughal Empire ruled the region. The Punjab region became predominantly Muslim due to missionary Sufi saints whose dargahs dot the landscape of the region. During the Delhi Sultanate period, a large city was situated at the site of the present village of Mehdiabad. But afterwards, this territory became unpopulated and was reclaimed by the jungle since there was a shortage of water and later Afghan incursions caused the population to leave. This situation persisted until Mughal Emperor Akbar's period. Hafizabad was formerly a place of some importance, and is mentioned in the Ain-i-Akbari as headquarters of a Mahal. Hafiz, the founder, was a favourite of emperor Mughal Emperor Akbar.

After the decline of the Mughal Empire, the Sikh Empire invaded and occupied Hafizabad District. The Muslims faced restrictions during Sikh rule.

In 1846, Hafizabad came under the supervision of British colonial rule, when a settlement of land revenue was effected under order from the provisional government at Lahore. The predominantly Muslim population supported Muslim League and Pakistan Movement. After the independence of Pakistan in 1947, the minority Hindus and Sikhs migrated to India while Muhajir refugees from India settled in the Hafizabad region. Most of the Muhajirs have since assimilated into the local population.

Geography
The district is located between 32°-20' north latitudes and 73°-12' and 73°-46' east longitude. The river Chenab forms the northern and northwestern boundary of the district. Hafizabad shares its borders with Sheikhupura District and Gujranwala District in the east, Mandi Bahauddin District in the north, Sargodha District in the west, Faisalabad and Chiniot District in the south. Hafizabad is situated at a distance of 303 km from the Federal Capital, Islamabad, and is 109 km away from the Provincial Capital, Lahore. The district has a total area of 2,367 square kilometres and comprises two tehsils, namely Hafizabad and Pindi Bhattian. Major villages are Sukheke Mandi, Jalalpur Bhattian , Vanike Tarar, Kaleki Mandi and Kot Hasan Khan.

Administration
The district is administratively subdivided into two tehsils, these are:
 Hafizabad Tehsil
 Pindi Bhattian Tehsil

Climate
The climate of the district is hot and dry during the summer and moderately cold in the winter. Owing to the proximity of the hills, there is more rainfall in the east than the west. The monsoon season usually starts in the middle of July and continues until September. The soil is alluvial and fertile.

Industry
Rice, power, and loom industries are important industries, located in Hafizabad city. Hafizabad Textile Power Loom industry is directly connected with Faisalabad which is a major industrial city in Pakistan known for its textile industry.

Demographics
At the time of the 2011 census the district had a population of 1,156,954, of which 584,668 were males and 572,188 females. Rural population is 754,225 while the urban population is 402,729. Islam is the predominant religion with 99.10% of the population while Christians are 0.73% of the population.

At the time of the 2017 census, 96.29% of the population spoke Punjabi and 2.23% Urdu as their first language.

According to the 1998 census, the district had a population of 832,980, of which 26.73% were urban.

Education

Sub campuses of Sargodha University, and Virtual University of Pakistan and Government College University Faisalabad are established in the city. University of Hafizabad is now being constructed in Hafizabad.

Hafizabad has many colleges, including Punjab College, Riphah College , Aspire College, Government Post Graduate College, The Readers' School and KIPS College. All these colleges offer a wide range of certificate and degree programs.

The education level is quite good as these colleges bring positions in University of the Punjab.

Politics
District has nomination in National Assembly of Pakistan and Provincial Assembly of the Punjab as prior to 2017 Census of Pakistan, Hafizabad District had two national assembly and three provincial assembly seats that has been changed into one and only MNA with three MPA. NA-87 (Hafizabad) is newly created constituency that has 684,447 votes, Chaudhary Shoukat Ali Bhatti won the 2018 election on PTI ticket from this constituency against Saira Afzal Tarar who was contesting from PMLN side. and Mamoon Jaffar Tarar, Muzaffar Ali Sheikh and Ahsan Ansar Bhatti win respectively as member of Provincial Assembly of the Punjab.

References

 
1991 establishments in Pakistan
Districts of Punjab, Pakistan